Data defined storage (also referred to as a data centric approach) is a marketing term for managing, protecting, and realizing value from data by combining application, information and storage tiers. This is achieved through a process of combination, where users, applications and devices gain access to a repository of captured metadata that allows organizations to access, query and manipulate the critical components of the data to transform it into information, while providing a flexible and scalable platform for storage of the underlying data. The technology abstracts the data entirely from the storage, allowing full transparent access to users.

Core technology
Data defined storage focuses on metadata with an emphasis on the content, meaning and value of information over the media, type and location of data. Data centric management enables organizations to take a single, unified approach to managing data across large, distributed locations which includes the use of content and metadata indexing. The technology pillars include:
 Media Independent Data Storage: Data defined storage removes media centric data storage boundaries within and across solid-state drive, hard disk drive, cloud storage and tape storage platforms, enables linear scale out functionality through a grid based Map Reduce architecture that leverages enterprise object storage technology and provides transparent data access across globally distributed repositories for high volume storage performance.
Data Security & Identity Management: Data defined storage allows organizations to gain end-to-end identity management down to the individual user and device level to address growing enterprise mobility requirements and enhanced data security and information governance.
 Distributed Metadata Repository: Data defined storage enables organizations to virtualize aggregate file systems into a single global namespace. At ingestion; file, full text index and custom metadata is collected and stored in a distributed metadata repository. This repository is leveraged to enable speed and accuracy of search and discovery, and to extract value leading to informed business decisions and analytics.

Data defined storage builds on the benefits of both object storage and software-defined storage technologies, however, object and software-defined storage can only be mapped to the first of data defined storage's three main pillars: media independent data storage, which enables a media agnostic infrastructure - utilizing any type of storage, including low cost commodity storage to scale out to petabyte-level capacities. Data defined storage unifies all data repositories and exposes globally distributed stores through the global namespace, eliminating data silos and improving storage utilization.

The first marketing using this term was by Tarmin, in its GridBank product.
The data defined storage term might have been mentioned in 2013.  Tamrin issued press releases about customers.

The data defined storage term was used for object storage with open protocol access for file system virtualization, such as CIFS, NFS, FTP as well as REST APIs and other cloud protocols such as Amazon S3, CDMI and OpenStack.

See also
 Big data analytics
 Block storage
 Cloud storage
 Content-addressable storage
 Enterprise search
 Information governance
 Metadata management
 Object storage
 Scale out storage
 Software defined storage

References

External links
 New Storage Platforms: What's the Difference?
 Top Tips for Object Storage
 Object Storage Buying Guide
 A Data-Centric Approach to Managing Data in the Cloud
 Stop Buying Storage. Start Managing Information

Computer data storage